A harvest festival is an annual celebration which occurs around the time of the main harvest of a given region. Given regional differences in climates and crops, harvest festivals can be found at various times throughout the world.

Africa
 Ikore: celebrated by the Yoruba people in Nigeria
 Homowo: a harvest festival celebrated by the Ga people of Ghana.
 Incwala: celebrated by the people of Swaziland
 New Yam Festival (Iwa ji): celebrated by the Igbo of Nigeria
 Umkhosi Wokweshwama:  celebrated by the Zulu people of South Africa
 Mokete wa Mokopu:  celebrated by the Makgolokwe-a-Mafhleng of South Africa
Asia

 East Asia  
 Chuseok: Korea
 Mid-Autumn Festival: China, Taiwan; the eighth full moon according to the lunar calendar
 Niiname-sai, Shinjō-sai, Honen Matsuri, Tsukimi: Japan

Indian subcontinent

 Akhatrij (Akshaya Tritiya): celebrated in West India, especially the Gujarat, Maharashtra, Madhya Pradesh, Rajasthan, Goa and Konkan regions
 Nuakhai (Nuakhai): celebrated in Odisha, to welcome the new rice of the season. According to the Kosali calendar it is observed on panchami tithi (the fifth day) of the lunar fortnight of the month of Bhadrapada or Bhaadra (August–September), the day after the Ganesh Chaturthi festival.
 Bhogali Bihu (or Magh Bihu): Assam, marks the end of harvesting season in mid-January
 Chavang Kut: celebrated by the Kuki-chin group in North-east India on 1 November
 Deepoli Parba: celebrated by the Tuluva people from Karnataka/Kerala, India
 Dree Festival: agricultural festival of the Apatanis of Ziro valley in Lower Subansiri District of Arunachal Pradesh, celebrated from 4 to 7 July
 Gudi Padwa: celebrated by the Marathi people in Maharashtra, Karnataka, India
 Holi: Northwest India, especially Uttar Pradesh, Bihar, Telangana, Maharashtra, Rajasthan and Gujarat
 JurShital: Mithila (portion of Bihar and Nepal); 13 or 14 April
 Kanyarkali: agricultural festival of the Malayalee Moothan, Nair and Tharakan communities of Chittur and Alathur thaluks of Palakkad in Kerala, India
 Lohri: North India, especially Punjab
 Monti Fest: celebrated on 8 September; celebrates the Nativity of the Blessed Virgin Mary; in the Mangalorean Catholic community involves blessing of Novem (new crops)
 Nabanna: Bengal region which comprises Bangladesh and West Bengal, India
 Onam and Vishu: agricultural festivals celebrated by Malayali people in Kerala and elsewhere in the world
 Pongal: celebrated by the Tamil people in Tamil Nadu, India and other places
 Puthari / Huthari: Coorg, Karnataka in south India
 Sankranthi or Makar Sankranti:  almost all regions of India, including Maharashtra, Gujarat, Karnataka, Andhra Pradesh, Bihar, Madhya Pradesh, Telangana, Uttar Pradesh and West Bengal; celebrated in January; goes by different names in different states
 Traditional New Year: celebration in Sri Lanka coincides with the harvest festival in mid-April
 Ugadi: celebrated by Telugu people in Andhra Pradesh, Telangana and Kannadigas in Karnataka, India
 Agera: celebrated by East Indians in Mumbai; falls on the first Sunday of October.
 Vishu is the harvest festival in Kerala and celebrated in April - usually April 14 or 15Vaisakhi (or Baisakhi: celebrated by Punjabi people in Punjab, other parts of North India and elsewhere; falls on the first day of Vaisakh month (usually mid-April), and marks the Punjabi New Year
 Pola or Without Amavasya: Celebrated by the farmers of Maharashtra on the last day of month of Shravan. Bullock worship is performed on this day.
 Vasant Panchami: West India, especially Gujarat; celebrated in Nepal, West Bengal, and Bangladesh to invoke wisdom and consciousness; in the Punjab region, it is celebrated as the Basant Festival of kites
 Tokhu Emong: celebrated among Lotha Tribe of Nagaland in India

Southeast Asia

 Flores de Mayo: Philippines
 Gawai Dayak: Sarawak, Malaysia and West Kalimtan, Indonesia
 Kaamatan: Sabah in Malaysia
 Kadayawan: Davao City, Philippines
 Khuado: Zomi, Chin State, Myanmar
 Maras Taun: Belitung, Indonesia
 Pacu jawi: Tanah Datar, Indonesia
 Pahiyás: Lucban, Philippines
 Tết Trung Thu: Vietnam

Middle East
 Hasyl toýy (or Hasyl Bayramy): Turkmenistan: traditionally last Sunday in November; observed second Sunday of November since specified in the Labor Code c. 2017
 Mehregan: Iran, Ancient Persia; 2 October
 Sukkot: Jewish harvest festival lasting eight days in the autumn, in which time is spent in tabernacles or booths
 Shavuot: Jewish harvest festival marking the wheat harvest in Israel
 Alaverdoba and Rtveli: Georgia

Europe

 Bagach (Багач): Belarus
 Bénichon: celebrated (usually by a huge seven-course menu) in Catholic parts of the French-speaking Switzerland; a combined harvest festival, thanksgiving and Rindya (the day when the animals are brought back from the high altitude pastures in the Alps and when all villagers are also therefore back); see :fr:Bénichon
 Dankdag voor Gewas en Arbeid: Netherlands, every first Wednesday of November; Thanksgiving Day for crop and labor
 Dożynki: Poland / Dazhynki: Belarus / Dožínky, Obžinky: Czech Republic / Обжинки (Obzhynky or Obzhynky): Ukraine / Обжинки (Obzhynki), Осенины (Oseniny) : Russia, a Slavic harvest festival celebrated in several central and eastern European countries
 Erntedankfest (Harvest Thanksgiving): Germany and Austria; traditionally on the first Sunday after Michaelmas, this means 30 September or later. At present, Protestant and Catholic churches recommend the first Sunday in October.
 Erntedankfest Düsseldorf-Urdenbach
 Festa e Grurit (Wheat Festival): used to mark the end of the harvest of wheat in Communist Albania; no longer observed
 Freyfaxi (August 1): marks the beginning of the harvest in Norse paganism; historically from Iceland, the celebration consists of blót, horse races, martial sports, and other events, often dedicated to the god Freyr
 Guldize: Cornwall, United Kingdom
 Harvest festival: United Kingdom
 Kekri: an old Finnish feast celebrated at the beginning of November, corresponding to Halloween
 Lammas or Lughnasadh: celebration of first harvest/grain harvest in Paganism and Wicca spirituality and by the ancient Celts; 1 August
 Mabon (Autumnal Equinox): the second of three recognized harvest sabbats in Paganism and Wicca
 Mhellia: Isle of Man
 Miķeļdiena: harvest festival in Latvia; 29 September; signals the end of summer (Mikeli)

 Прачыстая 'Prachystaya': Belarus
 The Presidential Harvest Festival in Spała and Jasna Góra Harvest Festival: Poland, first week of September to begin the first week of October
 Samhain: the third and final of three recognized harvest sabbats in Paganism and Wicca; celebration of the end of the harvest season and beginning of the Celtic New Year; 31 October
 Savior of the Apple Feast Day: Russia, Ukraine; 19 August
 Spice wreath / Cununa de spice: Romania; July
 Szüreti Fesztivál or Szüreti Napok: literally "harvest festival" or "harvest days"; celebrated in various rural towns of Hungary
 Timoleague: annual harvest festival held in August; Tigh Molaige in Irish

The Americas

Caribbean
 Crop Over: Barbados

South America
 Fiesta Nacional de la Vendimia'': Argentina

References

External links

Harvest
 Harvest
Harvest